Mlakva is a village in Perušić municipality, Croatia.

History
During World War II, as part of their genocide targeting ethnic Serbs, the Croatian fascist Ustaše regime killed and burned more than 280 Serb villagers in Mlakva on 6 August 1941, including 191 children.

Demographics
The 2011 population was 51.

References

Populated places in Lika-Senj County